Walesby is a village and civil parish in Nottinghamshire, England. At the time of the 2001 census it had a population of 1,255 people, increasing slightly to 1,266 at the 2011 census. The parish church of St Edmund is Perpendicular in style.

The former noble proprietor being the Duke of Newcastle who was then the Earl of Clare, sold the land and manor house in the mid 1700s, now being Lound Hall and Lound Hall Estate, east of Bothamsall village.

The village is famous for its forest, part of which forms a  Scout camp site. Along with one public house, the Red Lion and the Carpenters Arms, a small Italian kitchen restaurant. There is also a garage and a primary school. The village has a small park with a skate ramp and playground. The Walesby Forest Scout Camp is just outside the village. It hosts international scouting festivals amongst other events. The village and scout camp are also located by a series of streams and the villages of Milton, Kirton, Boughton (pronounced Boot'n) and the town of New Ollerton.

Notable people
Duncan Pocklington (1841–1870), cricketer, rower and clergyman

References

External links

 Walesby Forest

Villages in Nottinghamshire
Newark and Sherwood